INC may refer to:

Organizations

Iglesia ni Cristo, an indigenous Christian religious organization originating in the Philippines
Ijaw National Congress, a representative body formed in 1991 of Ijaw-speaking people
Indian National Congress, one of the national political parties in India
Indian National Council, an organisation founded 1941 in Bangkok
Insel Air, a former airline based in Curacao (ICAO code INC)
International Network of Churches, an Australian network of Pentecostal churches
International Network of Crackers, a major warez organization during the early 1990s
International Numismatic Council, an international co-ordinating body for numismatics,
Iraqi National Congress, an umbrella Iraqi opposition group led by Ahmed Chalabi
National Institute of Culture of Peru

Other uses
Interim National Constitution of the Republic of Sudan, 2005
The (International) Noise Conspiracy, a Swedish rock band
Yinchuan Hedong Airport, China (IATA code INC)
INC, an instruction in some assembly languages
Independent Network Charismatic Christianity

See also
 Inc. (disambiguation)